Edward John Greatrex (born 18 November 1936) was an English cricketer and footballer. He was a right-handed batsman and wicket-keeper who played for Norfolk. He was born in Nuneaton.

Greatrex, who represented Norfolk in the Minor Counties Championship for seventeen seasons, made a single List A appearance for the team, during the 1970 Gillette Cup. He scored 12 runs with the bat.

Greatrex also played football as a goalkeeper for Norwich City, Cambridge City, Chelmsford City, Clacton Town, Bury Town and Great Yarmouth Town. Greatrex made one Football League appearance for Norwich.

External links
John Greatrex at Cricket Archive

References

1936 births
Living people
English cricketers
Norfolk cricketers
Sportspeople from Nuneaton
Association football goalkeepers
English footballers
Norwich City F.C. players
Chelmsford City F.C. players
Cambridge City F.C. players
F.C. Clacton players
Bury Town F.C. players
Great Yarmouth Town F.C. players
English Football League players